The 158th Field Artillery Regiment is a Field Artillery regiment of the Army National Guard.

Lineage

    Constituted 26 February 1920 in the Oklahoma National Guard as the 158th Field Artillery
    Organized 1921-1923 from new and existing units (less Battery A, allotted to the New Mexico National Guard and Battery E, allotted to the Arizona National Guard); Headquarters Federally recognized 15 May 1923 at Anadarko
    Inducted into Federal service 16 September 1940 at home stations
    Regiment broken up 11 February 1942 and its elements reorganized and redesignated as follows:
    Headquarters and Headquarters Battery disbanded
    1st Battalion as the 158th Field Artillery Battalion and assigned to the 45th Infantry Division
    (2d Battalion as the 207th Field Artillery Battalion - hereafter separate lineage)
    158th Field Artillery Battalion inactivated 24 November 1945 at Camp Bowie, Texas
    Consolidated 27 September 1946 with Headquarters, 158th Field Artillery (reconstituted 25 August 1945 in the Oklahoma National Guard), reorganized, and Federally recognized as the 158th Field Artillery Battalion with Headquarters at Chickasha
    Ordered into active Federal service 1 September 1950 at home stations
    (158th Field Artillery Battalion [NGUS] organized and Federally recognized 3 November 1952 with Headquarters at Chickasha)
    Released 30 April 1954 from active Federal service and reverted to state control; Federal recognition concurrently withdrawn from the 158th Field Artillery Battalion (NGUS)
    Reorganized and redesignated 1 May 1959 as the 158th Artillery, a parent regiment under the Combat Arms Regimental System, to consist of the 1st and 2d Howitzer Battalions, elements of the 45th Infantry Division
    Reorganized 1 April 1963 to consist of the 1st Battalion, an element of the 45th Infantry Division
    Reorganized 1 February 1968 to consist of the 1st Battalion
    Reorganized 1 December 1971 to consist of the 1st Field Artillery Battalion
    Redesignated 1 May 1972 as the 158th Field Artillery
    Reorganized 1 May 1975 to consist of the 1st and 2d Battalions
    Reorganized 1 April 1977 to consist of the 1st Battalion
    Withdrawn 1 June 1989 from the Combat Arms Regimental System and reorganized under the United States Army Regimental System
    (1st Battalion ordered into active Federal service 21 November 1990 at home stations; released 23 May 1991 from active Federal service and reverted to state control)
    (1st Battalion ordered into active Federal service 15 March 2003 at home stations; released from active Federal service 27 May 2003 and reverted to state control)
    Redesignated 1 October 2005 as the 158th Field Artillery Regiment
    (1st Battalion, ordered into active Federal service 19 August 2008 at home stations)
    Reorganized 1 September 2008 to consist of the 1st Battalion, an element of the 45th Infantry Brigade Combat Team
    (1st Battalion released from active Federal service 22 September 2009 and reverted to state control)

Distinctive unit insignia
 Description
A Gold color metal and enamel device  in height consisting of the shield, crest and motto of the coat of arms.
 Symbolism
The dominant colors, red and yellow, are for Artillery. The broad arrow-a large missile thrown by machine-was an early version of artillery. The three broad arrowheads represent the recognition awarded the organization for service in Sicily, Naples and Southern France. The green wedge symbolizes mountainous Italy, and the fleur-de-lis is for French and Central European service.
 Background
The distinctive unit insignia was originally approved for the 158th Field Artillery Battalion on 14 January 1952. It was redesignated for the 158th Artillery Regiment on 2 November 1960. The insignia was redesignated for the 158th Field Artillery Regiment on 19 July 1972.

Coat of arms
Blazon
 Shield: Per chevron debased Gules and Vert, three broad arrows one and two, points meeting at apex of partition line Or, in base a fleur-de-lis of the like.
 Crest: That for the regiments and separate battalions of the Oklahoma Army National Guard: On a wreath of the colors Or and Gules an Indian's head with war bonnet all Proper.
 Motto: UNUSUAL EFFORTS EXPENDED.
 Symbolism
 Shield: The dominant colors, red and yellow, are for Artillery. The broad arrow-a large missile thrown by machine-was an early version of artillery. The three broad arrowheads represent the recognition awarded the organization for service in Sicily, Naples and Southern France. The green wedge symbolizes mountainous Italy, and the fleur-de-lis is for French and Central European service.
 Crest: The crest is that of the Oklahoma Army National Guard.
 Background: The coat of arms was originally approved for the 158th Field Artillery Battalion on 14 January 1952. It was redesignated for the 158th Artillery Regiment on 2 November 1960. The insignia was redesignated for the 158th Field Artillery Regiment on 19 July 1972.

Campaign credits
 World War II
 Sicily (with arrowhead)
 Naples-Foggia (with arrowhead)
 Anzio
 Rome-Arno
 Southern France (with arrowhead)
 Rhineland
 Ardennes-Alsace
 Central Europe
 Korean war
 Second Korean winter
 Korea, summer-fall 1952
 Third Korean winter
 Korea, summer 1953
  1990-1991 Desert Shield and Desert Storm
 War on Terrorism (Iraq)
 Iraqi Surge
 Iraqi Sovereignty
 Operation Enduring Freedom
 Afghanistan

Decorations
 French croix de Guerre with Palm, World War II, Streamer embroidered ACQUAFONDATA
 Republic of Korea Presedetial Unit Citation, Streamer embroidered KOREA

Current units
 1st Battalion, 158th Field Artillery Regiment  (assigned to the separate 45th Field Artillery Brigade)
 2d Battalion, 158th Field Artillery Regiment (inactive)

See also
 Field Artillery Branch (United States)

References

Field artillery regiments of the United States Army
Field artillery regiments of the United States Army National Guard
Military units and formations in Oklahoma
United States Army units and formations in the Korean War
Military units and formations established in 1920